Martin Cameron is an Australian politician who is the current member for the district of Morwell in the Victorian Legislative Assembly. He is a member of the Nationals and was elected in the 2022 state election, following the retirement of former member Russell Northe.

Cameron has stated that he was a plumber.

References

Living people
Members of the Victorian Legislative Assembly
National Party of Australia members of the Parliament of Victoria
21st-century Australian politicians
Year of birth missing (living people)